Farnham James Johnson (June 23, 1924 – December 12, 2001) was a professional American football player.

Biography
Johnson was born Farnham James Johnson on June 23, 1924, in Saint Paul, Minnesota. He attended St. Mary Central High School in Neenah, Wisconsin. During World War II, he served with the United States Marine Corps, achieving the rank of first lieutenant. Johnson died on December 12, 2001. He was buried at Corinth National Cemetery.

Career
Farnham played with the Chicago Rockets of the All-America Football Conference in 1948. He played at the collegiate level at the University of Michigan and the University of Wisconsin–Madison.

References

External links

Sportspeople from Neenah, Wisconsin
Players of American football from Saint Paul, Minnesota
Players of American football from Wisconsin
Chicago Rockets players
Michigan Wolverines football players
Wisconsin Badgers football players
Military personnel from Wisconsin
United States Marine Corps personnel of World War II
United States Marine Corps officers
1924 births
2001 deaths